A lithobolos refers to any mechanical artillery weapon used and/or referred to as a stone thrower in ancient warfare. Typically this referred to engines that propel a stone along a flat track with two rigid bow arms powered by torsion (twisted cord), in particular all sizes of palintonon.

However, Charon of Magnesia referred to his flexion (bow) stone-thrower engine, a  gastraphetes shooting 5–6 mina, as a lithobolos; Isidoros of Abydos reportedly built a larger  version shooting . Also, the euthytonon, a single-arm torsion catapult, was referred to by contemporaries as a stone-thrower, as was its Roman evolution the onager.

Stone-throwers of the same class looked alike, with their stone capacity scaling mostly with overall size. Machine dimensions can be approximated mathematically based on the equivalent spring diameter.

History
Buddhist texts record Magadhan Emperor Ajatashatru as having commissioned stone-throwers (mahashilakantaka) in his campaign against the Licchavis in the 5th century BCE. 

The first recorded European stone-thrower machines were used by the armies of Philip of Macedon and Alexander the Great. Polydias, Charias, and Diades of Pella, are the three engineers recorded designing machines for these armies, with Diades engineering at the sieges of Halicarnassus (334 BC) and Gaza (332 BC).

Anti-personnel stonethrowers hurled much smaller balls, though arrow-shooters like the scorpio were preferred for these purposes. Balls of such size were found in small numbers in the arsenals of Carthage and Pergamon, corroborating ancient reports of their use. The Roman artillery engineer Vitruvius provided measurements for even more powerful stone-throwers, but it is not known whether these were ever used in combat.

Siege engines of all types have been recorded as mounted on ships, with perhaps their first successful use at the Battle of Salamis (306 BCE) under the command of Demetrius "The Besieger".

During the Siege of Syracuse (214–212 BCE), the Greek defenders used a barrage of machines developed by Archimedes, including powerful stone-throwing ballistas. Archimedes had the record for the largest stone launched in the ancient world, from a ship-mounted engine, reported at 3 talents. 

Other Greco-Roman engineers and recorders of stone-throwers include
Zopyrus of Tarentum, Charon of Magnesia, Biton, Ctesibius of Alexandria, Dionysius of Alexandria, and Hero of Alexandria.

Variants
The Roman onager, a catapult powered by rope torsion, was sometimes referred to as a stone-thrower.

Archimedes reportedly designed a steam-powered gun to shoot spherical projectiles using the same principle of gas pressure as a gunpowder cannon. Leonardo da Vinci drew a design for a steam gun that he named "Architronito", citing Archimedes.

Aristotle first observed the phenomenon of aerodynamic heating in the slight melting of the face of lead bullets thrown from ancient catapults and ballistas, using this to make some correct deductions of the physics of gases and temperature.

See also
Ballista
Catapult
Crossbow
Trebuchet

References

External links
  Source cited for blueprints. Source for images: 
  More photos and details at 
 Legion XXIV made Palintonon reconstruction. 
 Digital reproduction ad with diagrams: 
 Palintonon image.

Ancient Greek artillery